Sauvagella is a genus of small fresh and brackish water fish in the family Clupeidae.  There are currently two species, both of which are endemic to Madagascar.

Species 
 Sauvagella madagascariensis (Sauvage, 1883) (Madagascar round herring)
 Sauvagella robusta Stiassny, 2002

References 

 

 
Clupeidae
Freshwater fish genera
Taxa named by Léon Bertin
Taxonomy articles created by Polbot